The Survivors is a high-profile prime time soap opera aired by the ABC television network as part of its Fall 1969 lineup.

History
Hollywood film star Lana Turner made her only television appearance as a regular series character on The Survivors. The show also starred other "big names", including Jan-Michael Vincent, Ralph Bellamy, Diana Muldaur, George Hamilton, Louis Hayward, Kevin McCarthy, Clu Gulager, and Natalie Schafer. Despite their presence, and that above the title of bestselling author Harold Robbins, since the characters were from his novel of the same name, the program was a ratings fiasco, losing badly to Mayberry R.F.D. and The Doris Day Show on CBS and The NBC Monday Movie on NBC. It was cancelled at midseason, although it was rerun the following summer.

Cast
George Hamilton as Duncan Carlyle
Lana Turner as Tracy Carlyle Hastings
Kevin McCarthy as Philip Hastings
Rossano Brazzi as Antaeus Riakos 
Diana Muldaur as Belle Wheeler
Robert Lipton as Tom Steinberg 
Jan-Michael Vincent as Jeffrey Hastings 
Louise Sorel as Jean Vale 
Ralph Bellamy as Baylor Carlyle
Kathy Cannon as Sheila Riley 
Louis Hayward as Jonathan Carlyle

Episodes

Television film
A made-for-TV-movie was made in 1971 based on the series titled The Last of the Powerseekers. Universal Television decided to re-edit two of The Survivors episodes into the TV movie.

References

Citations

Sources

Further reading
Brooks, Tim and Marsh, Earle, The Complete Directory to Prime Time Network and Cable TV Shows

External links
 Time Magazine, "Rescuing the Survivors"; Aug. 01, 1969
 

American Broadcasting Company original programming
1969 American television series debuts
1970 American television series endings
American television soap operas
American primetime television soap operas
Television shows based on American novels
Television series by Universal Television
English-language television shows